The Chevrolet Montana is a front-wheel drive coupé utility (first two generations)/crossover pickup (third generation) manufactured by General Motors under the Chevrolet brand since 2003. Mainly produced in Brazil and marketed throughout Latin America, the first and second-generation Montana was also produced and marketed in South Africa as the Opel Corsa Utility, Chevrolet Corsa Utility and Chevrolet Utility.

In Mexico, the vehicle was known as Chevrolet Tornado, because Pontiac had already used the Montana name for its minivan offering for North America. The design of the first generation is a variation of the Opel Corsa, while the second generation is based on the Chevrolet Agile. The third-generation Montana is slated to enter production in 2023 as a larger four-door pickup.



First generation (2003)

The Montana used a 1.4 L "Ecoflex" and a 1.8 L 8V flex-fuel I4 engines. In some markets like South Africa where it was sold as the Opel Corsa Utility until June 2010, the vehicle was offered with more engine options, but none flex fuel, like the 1.4 petrol and the 1.7 Isuzu turbodiesel.

In 2007, the Montana was available in two versions: Montana Conquest and Montana Sport which had a slightly different design and set of accessories. The trunk can be loaded with up to  according to the manufacturer.

This model was manufactured in São José dos Campos, Brazil, until 2010. In South Africa, it was assembled from Brazilian supplied CKD units.

Mexico
The Montana arrived in the model year of 2004, replacing the aged Corsa B based Chevy Pickup, but with the Tornado nameplate, because the Pontiac Montana was available in Mexico at the time.

It was based on the Chevrolet Corsa C and although the Corsa was dropped from the Mexican Chevrolet line-up after the model year of 2008, the Tornado lived on for a few more years. It was the only car built in Brazil in the Mexican Chevrolet lineup.

South Africa
The model was released in South Africa in 2003. It was sold as the Opel Corsa Utility, and replaced the Corsa B Utility pickup. In June 2010, General Motors renamed it to Chevrolet Corsa Utility as the company prepared to phase out Opel in the country. It was available in a choice of three engine variations, namely 1.4 and 1.8 petrol engines, as well as a 1.7 turbo-diesel. Three different trim levels were available across the range: Base, Club and Sport.

Second generation (2011)

Despite short sales of the Chevrolet Corsa Utility in South Africa, Chevrolet had decided to replace the Corsa C Utility with the Agile Utility. It became known as the Montana, Tornado, or Utility, depending on the market.

The Tornado was discontinued in Mexico in 2020.

South Africa 
The vehicle was introduced in South Africa as the Chevrolet Utility in 2012.

Third generation (2023)

The third-generation Montana was introduced on 1 December 2022 in Brazil. It becomes a larger pickup with four doors, sharing the same GEM platform with the Tracker. It will be built at the São Caetano do Sul plant in Brazil. It will be sold in the first half of 2023 and will also be exported to markets outside of Latin America. The project was previously delayed from 2022 due to the supply chain shortage.

References

External links

  

Montana
Coupé utilities
Sport utility trucks
Cars of Brazil
Front-wheel-drive vehicles
2000s cars
2010s cars
2020s cars